The 2016 Women's Oceania Handball Championship was the seventh edition of the Oceania Handball Nations Cup, held on 5 and 6 October at Blacktown Leisure Centre, Stanhope Gardens, Sydney, Australia.

Australia and New Zealand played in a two-legged game against each other, the aggregate winner would be the Oceania Champion. Australia won the two-game series. The next step in the qualification process for the 2017 World Women's Handball Championship was the Asian Championships in Korea in March 2017.

Results

All times are local (UTC+10).

Game 1

Game 2

References

External links
Oceania Continent Handball Federation webpage
Rouse Hill Times. Page 39. 12 October 2016

Oceania Women championship
2016 Women
2016 Oceania Women's Handball Champions Cup
Women's handball in Australia
2016 in Australian sport
October 2016 sports events in Australia